Acanthobrama is a genus of ray-finned fish in the family Cyprinidae found mostly in the Near East.

Species 
 Acanthobrama centisquama Heckel, 1843
 Acanthobrama hadiyahensis Coad, Alkahem & Behnke, 1983
 †Acanthobrama hulensis Goren, Fishelson & Trewavas, 1973
 Acanthobrama lissneri Tortonese, 1952
 Acanthobrama marmid Heckel, 1843
 Acanthobrama microlepis (De Filippi, 1863)
 Acanthobrama orontis (Berg, 1949) 
 Acanthobrama persidis (Coad, 1981)
 Acanthobrama telavivensis Goren, Fishelson & Trewavas, 1973
 Acanthobrama terraesanctae Steinitz, 1952 (Kinneret bleak)
 Acanthobrama thisbeae Freyhof & Özulug, 2014 
 Acanthobrama tricolor, Lortet, 1883
 Acanthobrama urmianus, (Günther, 1899)

References
Species in Acanthobrama (n = 9) FishBase (March 2015)

 
Taxa named by Johann Jakob Heckel
Taxonomy articles created by Polbot